William Shankland Andrews (September 25, 1858 – August 5, 1936) was an American lawyer and politician from New York.

Life
He was the son of Chief Judge Charles Andrews, the husband of Mary Raymond Shipman Andrews and the great grandfather of Nancy Andrews, an American biologist. After completing studies at St. John's Academy, Manlius, New York, where he was Head Boy in 1872, Andrews graduated from Harvard College in 1880, received his Juris Doctor degree from Columbia University in 1882, and commenced practice in Syracuse in 1884.

He was a justice of the New York Supreme Court from 1900 to 1921. In 1917, he was designated by Governor Charles S. Whitman a judge of the New York Court of Appeals, and in 1921, he was elected to a regular seat. He dissented from several opinions by noted fellow judge Benjamin Cardozo. These included dissents in Palsgraf v. Long Island Railroad Co. and Meinhard v. Salmon, both cases in which Andrews expressed a sharply different philosophy of the responsibilities people owe to one another.

Andrews retired from the bench at the end of 1928 when he reached the constitutional age limit of 70 years. He died from a fall from his bed, three days after the death of his wife.

External links
Historical Society of the Courts of New York (portrait gallery with a link to a biography of William S. Andrews)

References

Harvard College alumni
Judges of the New York Court of Appeals
Politicians from Syracuse, New York
1858 births
1936 deaths
Columbia Law School alumni
Accidental deaths from falls
Accidental deaths in New York (state)
New York Supreme Court Justices
Manlius Pebble Hill School alumni
Lawyers from Syracuse, New York